Hypsidia is a genus of moths belonging to the subfamily Thyatirinae of the Drepanidae. It was described by Walter Rothschild in 1896.

Species
The niphosema species group
Hypsidia australica (Sick, 1938)
Hypsidia grisea Scoble & Edwards, 1988
Hypsidia microspila (Turner, 1942)
Hypsidia niphosema (Lower, 1908)
The erythropsalis species group
Hypsidia erythropsalis Rothschild, 1896
Hypsidia robinsoni Hacobian, 1986

References

Thyatirinae
Drepanidae genera
Taxa named by Walter Rothschild